Beirut Jam Sessions is a Lebanese concert promoter, booker, music management agency and media company founded in 2012 by Anthony Semaan, Jessica Naime, Talia Souki and Roy Jamhouri in Beirut, Lebanon. The organization plays a central role in developing and defining the Lebanese alternative music scene, namely by organizing filmed jam sessions between the more established international acts they book and the local Lebanese acts who they arrange to open for them at concerts.

Artists

Concerts
As concert promoters, Beirut Jam Sessions have worked with a wide range of alternative music acts from around the world, including Emilie Gassin, Nadeah (Nouvelle Vague), Pony Pony Run Run, The Royal Concept, Thomas Azier, Mike Dawes, We Were Evergreen and Son of Dave.

Management
Beirut Jam Sessions has also managed artists, namely the successful Lebanese folk act Postcards.

Videos
One of Beirut Jam Sessions main ways of creating an audience for Lebanese artists is through the production of high-quality music videos on its YouTube channel. In February 2020, there were 94 original videos on the channel, with over three million views. The videos are meant to be in "raw conditions, completely unplugged, in a random location in the country". Some videos featuring artists Beirut Jam Sessions haven't worked with directly, but who wanted to be involved in videos, such as Joss Stone, Ibrahim Maalouf, Charlie Winston and M.

References
Notes

External links

 

Music promoters
Music managers
Music organisations based in Lebanon